Lieutenant General Duma Mdutyana (18 December 1960, Mount Frere – 6 July 2016) was a South African Army officer who served as Chief of Joint Operations. He died after falling ill on a trip overseas.

Education
He matriculated from St. Johns College in Umtata and later obtained a master's degree in Defence Studies from Madras University, India.

Military career

He served in the Umkhonto weSizwe in Angola and after integrating into the SANDF, he served at EP Command, OC Group 6 and at Infantry Directorate before being appointed GOC 43 South African Brigade. He served as GOC Joint Operations HQ, Advisor to FARDC Chief of Defence Staff and Chief Director Operations from 2011.

Awards and decorations

References

 

 

1960 births
South African Army generals
University of Madras alumni
2016 deaths
UMkhonto we Sizwe personnel